The Vertu Motors Arena (formerly the Eagles Community Arena) is a multi-purpose built venue for events, meetings, sports and the community in the Elswick area of the city of Newcastle, England. The arena has a capacity for up to 3,500 spectators and is home to the Newcastle Eagles of the British Basketball League and Women's British Basketball League.

Background
It had been a stated aim of Newcastle Eagles owner Paul Blake 'for at least 10 years, probably longer' for the club and its foundation to own and control their own facility. The club had previously been based at the Metro Radio Arena and Northumbria University's Sport Central.

In partnership with Newcastle City Council, the North East Local Enterprise Partnership, Sport England and Newcastle College, planning permission was approved and construction work on the arena began in November 2017. The arena was officially opened in January 2019, when the Eagles hosted the Plymouth Raiders in a BBL Championship match.

The arena was awarded three prizes in special achievement, community value and social accessibility at the 2020 Lord Mayor's Design Awards.

International basketball matches

References

External links
 

Basketball venues in England
Indoor arenas in England
Sports venues in the United Kingdom
Multi-purpose stadiums in the United Kingdom
Newcastle Eagles
Sports venues in Newcastle upon Tyne